Margret Hagerup  (born 8 June 1980) is a Norwegian politician. 
She was elected representative to the Storting for the period 2017–2021 for the Conservative Party.

References

1980 births
Living people
Conservative Party (Norway) politicians
Members of the Storting
Rogaland politicians
21st-century Norwegian politicians